Ángel Díaz is the name of:

People in sports 

 Ángel Luis Rodríguez Díaz (born 1987), Spanish football (soccer) player
 Ángel Gastón Díaz (born 1981), Argentine football (soccer) player
 Ángel Díaz, Guatemalan decathlete who, among other things, competed in the 1983 World Championships in Athletics – Men's decathlon

People in public service 
 Ángel Romero Díaz (born 1979), social worker, politician, and writer-journalist from Spain
 Ángel Díaz de Entresotos (1927–2009), late Spanish politician and former President of Cantabria

Other people 
 Ángel Nieves Díaz (1951–2006), American convict
 Ángel Díaz (singer) (1929–1998), singer of Argentine tangos

 (in Spanish customs for surnames: the first name is the  family surname; the second name is the  family surname)